Mahmiran (also Romanized as Māhmīrān and Māmīrān; also known as Bāmīrān) is a village in Khusf Rural District, Central District, Khusf County, South Khorasan Province, Iran. At the 2006 census, its population was 126, in 33 families.

References 

Populated places in Khusf County